Cry 4 Help is the second extended play by American rapper Kari Faux, released on March 8, 2019 via Change Minds.

Track listing

References

2019 EPs
Hip hop EPs
Hip hop albums by American artists